(920–993), third son of Imperial Prince Atsumi (son of Emperor Uda),  a Kugyō (Japanese noble) of the Heian period. His mother was a daughter of Fujiwara no Tokihira. He became Minister of the Left in 978. His daughter Rinshi was married to Fujiwara no Michinaga, when Michinaga was in a far lower position. At first he disputed his daughter's marriage because of Michinaga's position, but his wife Bokushi (穆子) pushed for the marriage. Finally Michinaga became regent of the Emperor, so his wife was redeemed as a good judge of character. Michinaga came into Masazane's residence Tsuchimikado-dono (土御門殿).

He is the progenitor of the Uda Genji (宇多源氏).

Family

 Father: Imperial Prince Atsumi (敦実親王) (893–967)
 Mother: Fujiwara no Tokihira‘s daughter
 Wives:
 Minamoto no Kintada’s daughter
 Fujiwara Bokushi (931-1061)
 Fujiwara no Motokata’s daughter
 Fujiwara no Tamemitsu’s daughter
Children:
 Minamoto no Tokinaka (時中) (943–1002) - first son, progenitor of Niwata family and Ayanokōji family by Minamoto no Kintada’s daughter
 Minamoto no Sukenori (扶義) (951–998) - fourth son, progenitor of Sasaki clan by Fujiwara no Motokata’s daughter
 Minamoto no Michinori (通義) (d.998) by Fujiwara no Motokata’s daughter
 Minamoto no Tokimichi (時通) by Fujiwara Bokushi
 Minamoto no Tokikata (時方) by Fujiwara Bokushi
 Minamoto no Tokinobu (時叙) - priest (Jakugen, 寂源) by Fujiwara Bokushi
 Naritoki (済時)
 Narinobu (済信) by Minamoto no Kintada’s daughter
 Saijin (済信) (954–1030) - priest
 Minamoto no Rinshi (倫子) (964–1053) - married to Fujiwara no Michinaga by Fujiwara Bokushi
 daughter - married to Imperial Prince Munehira (son of Emperor Murakami)
 daughter - married to Fujiwara no Sadatoki
 Naka no Kimi (d.1000) - married to Fujiwara no Michitsuna by Fujiwara Bokushi

References

 Owada, T. et al. (2003). Nihonshi Shoka Keizu Jimmei Jiten. Kodansya. (Japanese)
 Hioki, S. (1990). Nihon Keifu Sōran. Kodansya. (Japanese)

Minamoto clan
920 births
993 deaths